Mary Allin Travers (November 9, 1936 – September 16, 2009) was an American singer-songwriter who was known for being in the famous 1960s folk trio Peter, Paul and Mary, along with Peter Yarrow and Paul Stookey. Travers grew up amid the burgeoning folk scene in New York City's Greenwich Village, and she released five solo albums. She sang in the contralto range.

Early life and education
Mary Travers was born in 1936 in Louisville, Kentucky, to Robert Travers and Virginia Coigney, journalists and active organizers of The Newspaper Guild, a trade union. In 1938, the family moved to Greenwich Village in New York City.

Mary attended the progressive Little Red School House, where she met musical icons like Pete Seeger and Paul Robeson. Robeson sang her lullabies. Travers left school in the 11th grade to become a member of the Song Swappers folk group.

Singing career

The Song Swappers sang backup for Pete Seeger on four reissue albums in 1955, when Folkways Records reissued a collection of Seeger's pro-union folk songs, Talking Union. Travers regarded her singing as a hobby and was shy about it, but was encouraged by fellow musicians. She also was in the cast of the Broadway show The Next President.

The group Peter, Paul and Mary was formed in 1961, and was an immediate success. They shared a manager, Albert Grossman, with Bob Dylan. Their success with Dylan's "Don't Think Twice, It's All Right" helped propel Dylan's Freewheelin' album into the U.S. Top 30 four months after its release.

Peter, Paul and Mary broke up in 1970, shortly after having their biggest UK hit, singer-songwriter John Denver's ballad "Leaving on a Jet Plane" (originally titled "Babe I Hate To Go") (UK No. 2, February 1970). The song, which reached the top of both the U.S. Billboard and Cash Box charts in December 1969, was the group's only number one hit.

Travers subsequently pursued a solo career and recorded five albums: Mary (1971), Morning Glory (1972), All My Choices (1973), Circles (1974) and It's in Everyone of Us (1978).

Peter, Paul and Mary re-formed in 1978, toured extensively, and issued many new albums until Travers' death. The group was inducted into the Vocal Group Hall of Fame in 1999.

Personal life
Travers was married four times.  Her first brief union, to John Filler, produced her older daughter, Erika, in 1960. In 1963, she married Barry Feinstein, a prominent freelance photographer of musicians and celebrities. Her younger daughter, Alicia, was born in 1966, and the couple divorced the following year. In the 1970s, she was married to Gerald Taylor, publisher of National Lampoon. Following her marriage to Taylor, Travers had a relationship for several years with lawyer Richard Ben-Veniste while raising her daughters in New York. In 1991 she married restaurateur Ethan Robbins and lived with him in the small town of Redding, Connecticut for the remainder of her life.

Illness and death
In 2004, Travers was diagnosed with leukemia. A bone marrow transplant in 2005 induced a temporary remission, but she died on September 16, 2009, at Danbury Hospital in Connecticut, from complications related to the marrow transplant and other treatments. She was buried at Umpawaug Cemetery in Redding, Connecticut.

Legacy
A memorial service for Travers was held on November 9, 2009, at Riverside Church In New York City.  The four-hour service, on what would have been her seventy-third birthday, was attended by a capacity crowd.  Two of the many reflections shared at the service speak to the impact of Mary Travers's work and the significance of her legacy.  Feminist Gloria Steinem commented that with her poise and conviction as a performer, Ms. Travers "seemed to us to be a free woman, and that helped us to be free." Folk singer and co-founder of the Newport Folk Festival, Theodore Bikel, mused on her roles as political activist and glamorous pop-music touchstone:

Solo discography
Mary, Warner Bros., 1971
Morning Glory, Warner Bros., 1972
All My Choices, Warner Bros., 1973
Circles, Warner Bros., 1974
It's in Everyone of Us, Chrysalis, 1978

See also
 List of people from the Louisville metropolitan area

References

External links
 .
 .
 .
 
 .
 .
 
 

1936 births
2009 deaths
Musicians from Louisville, Kentucky
American women singer-songwriters
American folk singers
Deaths from cancer in Connecticut
Deaths from leukemia
Singers from New York City
People from Redding, Connecticut
People from Greenwich Village
Warner Records artists
Chrysalis Records artists
20th-century American singers
Singer-songwriters from Kentucky
Folk musicians from Kentucky
American contraltos
Kentucky women musicians
Singers from Kentucky
20th-century American women singers
Little Red School House alumni
Singer-songwriters from New York (state)
21st-century American women
Singer-songwriters from Connecticut